San Uk Tsuen is a village Ha Tsuen, Yuen Long District, Hong Kong.

Administration
San Uk Tsuen is a recognized village under the New Territories Small House Policy.

References

External links
 Delineation of area of existing village San Uk Tsuen (Ha Tsuen) for election of resident representative (2019 to 2022)

Villages in Yuen Long District, Hong Kong
Ha Tsuen